The Toq (pronounced “tok” as in "tick-tock") is a smartwatch developed by Qualcomm released as a proof of concept to OEMs and was released in limited quantities in December 2013. The Toq was first unveiled at Qualcomm's annual Uplinq event on September 4, 2013 in San Diego. It syncs with Android 4.0+ smartphones, allowing users to scan through texts, emails, phone calls, and other notifications. It features a Mirasol display, which like E Ink e-reader screens, can be easily viewed in direct sunlight. Unlike most ereaders, it can display colors and can refresh fast enough for watching videos, it also includes speech recognition technology from Nuance to allow users to dictate replies to text messages. The Toq has a backlight for when there is no outside light source.

Specifications 
 200 MHz Cortex-M3 microcontroller
 1.55" Mirasol display
 Battery is inside the watchband and lasts for up to 5 days
 Charges wirelessly via a Qualcomm WiPower box

Reception 
The Verge thinks that Mirasol display is great for a smartwatch, however feels that the Toq is not compelling. With Mirasol, the touch screen never turns off, so it draws effectively no power when it is not changing states and the screen refreshes instantaneously like an LCD. The Toq is in full color, but the colors are muted.

See also 
 Smartwatch
 Wearable computer

References 

Smartwatches